The 2016–17 Yale Bulldogs men's ice hockey season was the 122nd season of play for the program and the 56th season in the ECAC Hockey conference. The Bulldogs represented Yale University and were coached by Keith Allain, in his 11th season.

Season
Despite losing two of its best defensive players to graduation, Yale entered the season ranked. After a bad week in mid-November, however, the team found itself outside of the top-20 and it quickly sank to the bottom of the conference. After finishing 3rd in the Shillelagh Tournament, Yale clawed its way back up to a .500 record and then promptly lost back-to-back matches to ranked teams.

After the disappointing start, Yale began the new year more focused and put together a strong stretch in the month of January. The Bulldogs went 6–1–2 with ties against #16 St. Lawrence and #6 Harvard, putting them in contention for the NCAA Tournament. In February, however, their fortunes reversed and the team won just one of its last eight games, finishing 8th in ECAC Hockey.

When the conference tournament began, Yale's only chance of reaching the national tournament was a conference championship. The team took care of business in the first round with a pair of wins over Dartmouth, which set up a showdown with arch-rival Harvard. By then the Crimson had risen to #2 in the country but they got a tougher challenge than they were expecting from the Bulldogs. Yale scored six goals in two games, but their defense wasn't able to hold back Harvard's attack. The Bulldogs dropped both games and abruptly ended a once-promising season.

Departures

Recruiting

Roster
As of August 1, 2016.

Standings

Schedule and results

|-
!colspan=12 style="color:white; background:#00356B" | Regular Season

|-
!colspan=12 style="color:white; background:#00356B" | 

|-
!colspan=12 style="color:white; background:#00356B" | 

|- align="center" bgcolor="#e0e0e0"
|colspan=12|Yale Won Series 2–0

|- align="center" bgcolor="#e0e0e0"
|colspan=12|Yale Lost Series 0–2

Scoring statistics

Goaltending statistics

Rankings

*USCHO did not release a poll in week 24.

Awards and honors

Players drafted into the NHL

2017 NHL Entry Draft

† incoming freshman

References

2021–22
Yale Bulldogs
Yale Bulldogs
Yale Bulldogs men's ice hockey season
Yale Bulldogs men's ice hockey season